()  is a county in the prefecture-level city of Huzhou, in the northwest of Zhejiang province. As of 2020 census, its population was 548,568 all living in the built-up (or metro) area. Deqing is very close to Hangzhou and Shaoxing, so it is becoming de facto a suburb of the two cities. It is being conurbated soon and even a Metro Line is planned in the middle term to link both cities.

Geography
Located in the middle of the plain between the Hangzhou Bay and the Taihu, most of Deqing County is flat, criss-crossed by numerous canals. The western end of the county is mountainous. There, the popular tourist areas of Moganshan is located. Moganshan is a scenic mountain, an hour from Hangzhou, with many pre-World War II villas built by foreigners, along with one of Chiang Kai-shek's Guomindang compounds.

Zisiqiao Village, located within Deqing County's Xinshi Town,  is renowned as a center of snake farming. The locals have been raising snakes since the 1980s; currently, about 800 people in Zisiqiao work in snake farming industry, raising some three million snakes a year. Live snakes are supplied to specialty restaurants; dried or preserved in alcohol, they are sold to manufacturers of traditional Chinese medicines; snake-infused wine is made as well. 
The village is nicknamed "Snake Village" by the media, and Deqing Snake Culture Museum is a local tourist attraction.

Administrative divisions
Towns:
Wukang (武康镇), Qianyuan (乾元镇), Xinshi (新市镇), Luoshe (洛舍镇), Xin'an (新安镇), Leidian (雷甸镇), Zhongguan (钟管镇), Yuyue (禹越镇), Moganshan (莫干山镇)

Climate

Religion
Yunxiu Temple is a Buddhist temple in Xiazhuhu Subdistrict.

Transportation
Deqing has two railway stations, normal trains serve through Deqing West railway station, which located on the Xuancheng–Hangzhou railway, with fairly frequent, although not particularly fast, passenger service to Hangzhou and Hefei. High speed trains serve Deqing railway station, on the Nanjing-Hangzhou high-speed railway.

Tourist attractions
The county houses many ancient bridges, such as Sengjia Bridge and Qinghe Bridge.

Notes

 
County-level divisions of Zhejiang
Huzhou